Kyym (lit. Spark) is the main Yakut language newspaper, published in Yakutsk five times a week. It also has an Internet version.

The volume of Kyym - 48 pages; Frequency - once a week, on Thursday.
The format is A3.

The founders of Kyym - LLC "Media Group "Sitim".

Chief editor of Kyym - Gavrilyev Ivan Ivanovich (sah).

History of the newspaper 
The first newspaper in the Yakut language was Manchaary, the first issue of which was published on 28 December 1921. Two years later, a commission of three people — the People's Commissar of the Interior Stepan Arzhakova, Commissar of Education Ilya Vinokurov and member of the board of Kholbos M. Popov - decided to make the newspaper periodical and give it a new name - Kyym (kɯ:m in Novgorodov's Alphabet and Kььm in Yañalif forms). The first publishers of the newspaper were Platon Oyunsky, Maksim Ammosov, Anempodist Sofronov.

In 1993, after the famous October events, the publication was closed. In 1994, the newspaper was published by a journalist Fedora Petrovna Egorova, who has been at the newspaper's office for 36 years.

References

External links
Online edition

Newspapers published in Russia
Newspapers published in the Soviet Union
Yakutsk
Yakut-language newspapers